Montelparo is a comune (municipality) in the Province of Fermo in the Italian region Marche, located about  south of Ancona, about  north of Ascoli Piceno and  of Fermo.

Montelparo borders the following municipalities: Force, Monsampietro Morico, Montalto delle Marche, Monte Rinaldo, Montedinove, Monteleone di Fermo, Rotella, Santa Vittoria in Matenano.

Demographic evolution

References

Cities and towns in the Marche